Parading in the Rain is the third studio album by Chalee Tennison, released September 16, 2003.

Critical reception
AllMusic's Johnny Loftus writes in his review that Chalee Tennison's third full-length album "is firmly, proudly contemporary country."

Track listing

Track information and credits taken from the album's liner notes.

References

2003 albums
DreamWorks Records albums
Chalee Tennison albums
Albums produced by James Stroud